Ra Ki or Ki Ra could refer to:

Ra. Ki. Rangarajan (1927–2012), a Tamil author.
Ra-Ki, a fictional character in the Guilty Gear video game
Ki. Rajanarayanan, a Tamil author sometimes known as "Ki Ra"
Kira (given name), evolved to the Persian and Egyptian word Ki-Ra for "like Ra, the sun"